OWBasic is an interpreted language environment that can be downloaded to Personal digital assistants like the Casio's Pocket viewer.

Description
Casio issued an SDK which amongst other things produced a programmable interpreter/compiler called OWBasic put together by Wolfgang Ortmann.
OWBasic was an implementation of the BASIC programming language.

OWbasic has most of the BASIC commands such as proc, gosub, conditional if/then statements and some others for graphing. OWBasic also allows a user to develop applications for string text, taking the CasioPV beyond the normal limits imposed by a standard programmable calculator. OWBasic turns the Casio-PV from a standard dumb-terminal PDA into a type of hand-held Acorn Electron BASIC computer.

OWBasic compiles a block of binary code which is then run on the interpreter, which is faster than interpreting individual text instruction lines at run time. So the user could now use their PV to write specific program applications for their handheld, with no requirement for a software development kit (SDK) on a desktop computer. The programs could be stored on the memory of the PDA.

External links
 http://www.audacia-software.de/en/pv/owbasic/index.htm
 Command Listing http://www.inf-cv.uni-jena.de/offen/noo/owbasic/manual/owb_e_intro.html
 :de:OWBasic

Programming tools